Edward "Ed" Stephenson (Eduardo de Rosamaria)(Edvard Stefanyshyn) (born 12 August 1976 in Toronto, Canada) is a classical/nuevo flamenco guitarist who has toured throughout North America since he was sixteen. He is also the founder of the Paco Band, the North Carolina Guitar Quartet, and the Stephenson Guitar Quartet.

Life and career

Early years 
Ed was the son of Edward Peter Stephenson, who passed when he was nine years of age. His mother, Rosemarie raised him and his sister Darlene until she remarried to Robert Grinton when Ed was thirteen. In his early teens, Ed won the Canadian Music Competition and the Kiwanis Music Competition. His early studies were with Ivan Maracle in Toronto, Canada who prepared Ed for his audition for Aaron Shearer at the Peabody Conservatory. 
Ed started his collegiate studies at the Peabody Conservatory, in Baltimore, Maryland, as an undergraduate student. Later, he relocated to North Carolina to complete his degree at the University of North Carolina School of the Arts  under the direction of Aaron Shearer. 

He performed at the grand opening of the Roger L. Stevens Center in Winston-Salem under the direction of Leonard Bernstein, with Isaac Stern as the soloist, and Gregory Peck as the master of ceremonies. Guests in attendance included Agnes de Mille, Cliff Robertson, Governor James Hunt, President and Mrs. Gerald Ford and Lady Bird Johnson. 

He has performed with the North Carolina Symphony, the Raleigh Symphony, the North Carolina Theater, North Carolina Bach Festival, and the Raleigh Ringers.

http://cvnc.org/article.cfm?articleId=5411

He has a cameo appearance on the reality TV show Lizard Lick Towing in 2014.

Meredith College 
Currently Ed is not the instructor of the guitar at Meredith College in Raleigh, North Carolina. He has also held faculty positions at Methodist University in Fayetteville, North Carolina and University of Mount Olive in Mount Olive, North Carolina.

Discography 
Ed Stephenson's most recent recording, Esencia, is craftily blended to deliver a new dimension of Nuevo flamenco music. It includes six ensemble tracks with Inos Flamenca and four solo tracks. Roger Cope of The Classical Voice of North Carolina praised the album saying, "The ensemble is tight with rhythmically biting and often infectious enthusiasm...The solos are duende-imbued renditions of standard classical guitar repertoire that are surprisingly effective and that refresh their signature elements."

 KYPOYKA - Ukrainian Children's Songs and Stories 
 Winter Branches - North Carolina Guitar quartet(Liscio Recordings) (1997)
 "INO" Live - Ed Stephenson and the Paco band (2008)
 Vivaldi Concerto in D major - Ed Stephenson (2009)
 Esencia - Ed Stephenson and the Paco band (Liscio Recordings) (2011)
 Rosamaria - Ed Stephenson and the Paco band (2015)

References 

Flamenco guitarists
1976 births
Living people
21st-century guitarists